The 1960 Rugby League World Cup was the third staging of the tournament and the first Rugby League World Cup to be held in Great Britain. The same format as used in 1957 was used, with a group stage leading to a final table.

The 1960 World Cup raised problems which had not really affected the previous tournaments. Live television of complete games was held responsible for lower than anticipated attendances, the largest crowd being the 32,773 which gathered at Odsal for the deciding match between Australia and the hosts.

For Australia the World Cup matches formed part of their Kangaroo Tour of Great Britain and France.

Squads

Venues

Results

Try scorers 
4

  Brian Carlson

3

  Alan Davies

2

  Reg Gasnier
  Raymond Gruppi
  Frank Myler
  Austin Rhodes
  Mick Sullivan
  Tom Hadfield

1

  Noel Kelly
  Johnny Raper
  Harry Wells
  Jacques Dubon
  Eric Ashton
  Billy Boston
  Brian McTigue
  Alex Murphy
  Jack Wilkinson
  Mel Cooke
  George Menzies
  Tom Reid
  George Turner

References

Sources 
 1960 World Cup at rlhalloffame.org.uk
 1960 World Cup at rlwc2008.com
 1960 World Cup at rugbyleagueproject.com
 1960 World Cup data at hunterlink.net.au
 1960 World Cup at 188-rugby-league.co.uk